Bakighaye is a settlement in Senegal. In 2002 the population was 142 in 20 households.

References

External links
PEPAM

Populated places in the Bignona Department
Arrondissement of Sindian